The men's water polo tournament at the 2011 World Aquatics Championships, organised by the FINA, was held in Shanghai, China from 18 to 30 July 2011.

The top three teams (excluding the already qualified Serbia) qualified for the 2012 Summer Olympics.

Qualification

Groups formed
The draw resulted in the following groups:

Preliminary round
All times are China Standard Time (UTC+8)

The draw for the competition was held on April 15, 2011.

Group A

Group B

Group C

Group D

Knockout stage
Championship bracket

Playoff round
The group winners have a bye into the quarterfinals.

Quarterfinals

Semifinals

Bronze medal game

Final

Classification 5–8 bracket

7th place game

5th place game

Classification 9–12 bracket

11th place game

9th place game

Classification 13–16 bracket

15th place game

13th place game

Final ranking

Medalists

Individual awards
 Most Valuable Player

 Best Goalkeeper

 Topscorer
 — 20 goals

References

External links
14th FINA World Championships 2011 FINA Water Polo website
Records and statistics (reports by Omega)
 Men Water Polo XIV World Championship 2011 www.todor66.com

2011
Men